A fen is a type of wetland.

Fen, Fenn, Fens, Fenns, may also refer to:

People 
 Fen (name), a Chinese given name and surname
 Fen Cresswell (1915–1966), New Zealand cricketer
 Fen McDonald (1891–1915), Australian rules footballer
 Kees Fens (1920–2008), Dutch writer
 Vitaly Fen (born ), Uzbekistani diplomat

Places
 The Fens, a low-lying geographical region of eastern England
 The Fens (Boston, Massachusetts), a park
 Fenns, Indiana, an unincorporated community
 Fen Complex, Norway, an area of unusual igneous rocks
 Fen Prefecture, a region of Imperial China
 Fen River, in China
Fenn College, predecessor of Cleveland State University
Fenn Tower, building on the campus of Cleveland State University
Fenn's Moss, part of a British nature reserve

Other uses
 Fen (band), a British metal band
 Fen (currency), a unit of the renminbi, the currency of China
Fen (play), a play by the British playwright Caryl Churchill
 Far East Network, a network of American military radio and television stations
 Federation of European Neuroscience Societies (FENS), a scholarly federation
 Fen TV, a Bulgarian television channel
 Fenny Stratford railway station, in England
 Fernando de Noronha Airport, in Brazil
 Festival of New Songs, a Slovenian music festival
 Flap endonuclease
 Forsyth–Edwards Notation (FEN) for chess positions
Fédération des Étudiants Nationalistes (FEN), a defunct French far-right students' association